Renaciendo is the second album by the Mexican band AK-7. The first Single of the album was "Dígale" which was released on August 5, 2008.

The album favors the romantic Latin pop side of duranguense. Many of the performances combine duranguense's rhythmic bounce with the type of smooth, polished Latin pop romanticism one associates with Marco Antonio Solís, Joan Sebastian, and Juan Gabriel. Granted, Renaciendo is hardly an album of slow ballad tempos. That romantic outlook also prevails on a likable cover of Spanish pop singer David Bisbal's "Dígale."

Track Listing

Charts

Credits
 Franco Giordani - Mastering, Mixing
 Gerardo Ramírez - Art Direction
 Adriana Rebold - Artistic Director
 Roberto Salas - Engineer
 Joel Solís - Engineer
 Rafael Solís - Art Direction, Vestuario

References

External links
 

2008 albums
AK-7 albums